Preston Doerflinger (born 1973) is an American businessman and politician who was the Oklahoma Secretary of Finance and Revenue. Doerflinger was appointed by then Governor of Oklahoma Mary Fallin on January 19, 2011. Prior to his appointment, Doerflinger served as the city auditor for Tulsa, Oklahoma from 2009 until this appointment as secretary. Shortly thereafter he was also named the Director of the newly created Office of Management and Enterprise Systems. In his role as Secretary of Finance he was the Governor’s lead budget executive and negotiator. He was appointed by the governor as the Interim Commissioner of Health in October, 2017 while maintaining his roles as Cabinet Secretary and Director of the Office of Management and Enterprise Systems. He resigned from all of his roles in Oklahoma State government in February 2018.

Biography
Doerflinger was raised in Oologah, Oklahoma. He earned a bachelor's degree in organizational leadership from Southern Nazarene University. Doerflinger was the Republican nominee for City Auditor for Tulsa, Oklahoma. He was elected in 2009 to a two-year term. As city auditor, he oversaw the City's Management Review Office and was tasked with the implementation of government service improvements.

On January 19, 2011, Governor of Oklahoma Mary Fallin announced that she had selected Doerflinger to serve as her Oklahoma Secretary of Finance and Revenue. The Governor also announced that she would appointment him to a concurrent term as the Director of the Oklahoma Office of State Finance, later consolidated with several state agencies to create the Office of Management and Enterprise Services. As Secretary, Doerflinger was responsible for preparing and implementing the Governor's budget as well as overseeing the Governor's fiscal policies. Doerflinger was also the Governor’s lead budget negotiator and received much acknowledgment and acclaim for his streamlined, fiscally efficient results as to both the state budget and the state agencies he directed. Doerflinger’s management and policies at the Office of Management and Enterprise Services led to hundreds of millions of dollars in savings of taxpayer dollars due to his consolidation of redundant functions, ability to attract and retain high quality professionals, and implementation of numerous technology Initiatives.

In October 2017, Doerflinger was named the Interim Commissioner of Health by Governor Mary Fallin after the previous Commissioner resigned amid allegations of financial and operational mismanagement. During his short tenure as Interim Commissioner of Health Doerflinger was credited with multiple advancements including a realignment of agency resources to better serve the public and public health, cancellation of many over-priced and illegal contracting schemes, and transforming the agency’s 1,800 employees to a transparent and empowered work force.

On February 13, 2018, Doerflinger resigned from state government after an article about an incident six years prior was published by Dylan Goforth with The Frontier. The article was in reference to 2012 Tulsa Police call logs, which included a 911 call relating to domestic abuse, which his ex-wife later recanted. The call log and 911 call were long known to the Governor and most in state government.  The article by The Frontier was not published until over six years after the incident, leading many to believe it was an orchestrated hit piece tipped off by a political foe of Doerflinger’s who resented his streamlined and efficient approach to government administration. It has further been speculated that The Frontier was pressured to publish the article due to it being a widely unknown publication criticized for having a strong political bias.

After Doerflinger’s resignation from Oklahoma state government, he continued development of his successful business enterprises, which includes partnerships with Oklahoma Native American tribes and numerous Fortune 500 companies.

Personal life
Doerflinger has one son with his wife Jill Doerflinger they were married in 2001 until 2017.

References

Governor Mary Fallin Selects Preston Doerflinger as Director of the Office of State Finance, Office of Governor Fallin, 2011-01-19

Living people
1973 births
State cabinet secretaries of Oklahoma
Heads of Oklahoma state agencies
Politicians from Tulsa, Oklahoma
Southern Nazarene University alumni
Oklahoma Republicans
Businesspeople from Tulsa, Oklahoma
21st-century American businesspeople
21st-century American politicians